Changsari railway station is located in the northern part of Guwahati town. It belongs to the Rangiya division of Northeast Frontier Railway. Nearby neighbourhood stations are Baihata railway station, Agthori railway station, Kamakhya railway station and Guwahati railway station.

Trains
Several passenger trains stops in this station, some of them are Alipur Duar Jn-Guwahati Passenger, Guwahati-New Bongaigaon Jn Manas Rhino Passenger, New Bongaigaon Jn-Guwahati Manas Rhino Passenger, New Bongaigaon Jn-Guwahati Passenger, Guwahati-New Bongaigaon Jn Passenger etc.

See also
Rangiya railway station

References

External links

Railway stations in Guwahati
Rangiya railway division